Lingo Canyon is a canyon in San Luis Obispo county in California.

It was named for George Washington Lingo, an early settler.  George Washington Lingo was a native of Randolph County, Missouri, where he was born on March 25, 1833, a son of Samuel Lingo, a Carolinian who came to Missouri by way of Tennessee.

See also

 La Panza Canyon

References

External links
Satellite view of the canyon

Landforms of San Luis Obispo County, California